Verolanuova is a comune in the province of Brescia, in Lombardy, northern Italy.

Transportation 
Verolanuova has a railway station on the Brescia–Cremona line.

Notable people
 

Paola Gambara Costa (1463-1515), Roman Catholic professed religious

References

Cities and towns in Lombardy